Intégrale : Institut d'enseignement supérieur privé (translatable by “Intégrale : Private Institute of Higher Education"), more simply called "Intégrale Prépa", is a French private establishment exclusively composed of classes préparatoires. It was founded in 1985 and has a high rate of admission to top "Grandes Écoles" such as HEC Paris, ESSEC Business School and ESCP Europe.

Locations 
Intégrale has two different campuses:

 Rue du Rocher, 8th arrondissement of Paris
 Rue de l'église, Clamart (Parisian suburb)

The Avenue Paul Doumer (16th arrondissement of Paris) location has now closed.

References 

Education in Paris
Universities and colleges in France